James Raymond Watkins (born October 21, 1956) is an American anchor and journalist.

Career 
Watkins was previously employed by WPIX-TV from October 26, 1998, to October 9, 2011, where he was the weeknight anchor for PIX11 News at Ten for 11 years. During Watkins' career as a New York City news anchor he also worked for WNBC-TV (weekends) and alongside WPIX's Kaity Tong for 14 years. While working at WPIX, Watkins received three Emmy awards and an Edward R. Murrow Award for Broadcast Excellence.

Watkins was Tribune Broadcasting's lead anchor during the 9/11 live television coverage consecutively for 5 days.  In 2014, his recollections of the tragedy, starting with the day before the World Trade Center attack, were featured in the NatGeo documentary "9/10: The Final Hours."

Watkins' TV news career also included time at WPHL Philadelphia (anchor), the syndicated FOX Los Angeles "Entertainment Daily Journal" (correspondent), WBZ Boston's "Evening Magazine" (co-host), and WTVF-TV Nashville (anchor).

Every year, Jim Watkins hosts a television program at the Hispanic Day Parade, which occurs on the second Sunday of October. Watkins, a native of Ohio, was a former anchor and reporter from CBS affiliate WTVF in Nashville, Tennessee. He is a graduate of the University of Tennessee. He writes columns for AM New York, a free weekday daily distributed in New York City. He also writes a blog for the television station's news program.

In 2014 Watkins joined News 8 WTNH-TV in New Haven Connecticut. On August 19, 2015, Watkins left WTNH News 8.

Personal life 
Watkins is married and has three children, including a teenage son with autism. Watkins is an autism advocate and has been a keynote speaker at numerous autism benefits.

References 

New York (state) television reporters
1956 births
Television anchors from New York City
American television journalists
People from Columbus, Ohio
Living people
American male journalists
Journalists from Ohio